Launac is a commune in the Haute-Garonne department in southwestern France.

Population

Sights
The Château de Launac is a 15th-century castle with additions and alterations from the 16th and 17th centuries. Privately owned, it is listed as a historic site by the French Ministry of Culture.

Sights

See also
Communes of the Haute-Garonne department

References

Communes of Haute-Garonne